Morning Like This is the ninth studio album by Christian/inspirational singer Sandi Patti and her first album on Word Records released in 1986. Morning Like This was considered a successful album and a turning point in her career. It was released in March 1986 and a few months after its release, Patti had reached national acclaim after her rendition of "The Star-Spangled Banner" was included during the ABC Statue of Liberty re-dedication broadcast on July 6, 1986. This exposure led to multiple mainstream television appearances including The Tonight Show and Christmas in Washington. The album was listed at No. 87 from CCM Magazine in their 2001 book CCM Presents: The 100 Greatest Albums in Christian Music. In 1987, Patti won 2 Grammy Awards for Best Gospel Performance, Female and Best Gospel Performance by a Duo or Group with R&B singer Deniece Williams for the track "They Say" from Williams' Gospel album So Glad I Know at the 29th Grammy Awards and later would win 3 GMA Dove Awards for Female Vocalist, Artist of the Year and Inspirational Album of the Year. The track "In The Name Of The Lord" would win a GMA Dove  Award for Song of the Year in 1988 given to Patti and her co-writers Gloria Gaither and Phil McHugh. Morning Like This topped the Billboard Top Christian Albums chart, finishing in the Top 3 for three years on their Inspirational Albums year-end charts, including taking the number 1 album of 1987 and was certified Gold in 1987 and Platinum in 1993 by the Recording Industry Association of America.

Track listing

Personnel 
 Sandi Patti – vocals, rhythm arrangements (2, 4-8)
 Bill George – acoustic piano (1)
 Shane Keister – keyboards (2, 4, 5), rhythm arrangements (2)
 Phil Naish – keyboards (2, 4, 5, 6, 8), rhythm arrangements (2, 4-8), synthesizers (7)
 David Huntsinger – acoustic piano (3, 7, 10)
 Steve Millikan – keyboard overdubs (5)
 Jon Goin – guitars (1, 2, 4-8)
 John Darnall – guitars (9, 10)
 Gary Lunn – bass (1)
 Mike Brignardello – bass (2, 4-8)
 Craig Nelson – bass (3, 9, 10)
 Mark Hammond – drums (1, 3, 9)
 Paul Leim – drums (2, 4-8)
 Ronald Vaughn – percussion (1)
 Farrell Morris – percussion (1, 9, 10)
 Pinebrook Brass – brass (1)
 Ernie Collins – brass (3)
 Barry Green – brass (3)
 Chris McDonald – brass (3)
 Rex Peer – brass (3)
 Paul Butcher – brass (3)
 Mike Haynes – brass (3)
 John Rommel – brass (3)
 Don Sheffield – brass (3)
 George Tidwell – brass (3)
 Michael Carrier – brass (3)
 Gilbert Long – brass (3)
 Michael Buckwalter – brass (3, 9)
 Robert Heuer – brass (3, 9)
 Barbara Hutchins – brass (3, 9)
 Tom McAninch – brass (3, 9)
 Eberhard Ramm – brass (3, 9)
 Rick Ricker – brass (3, 9)
 Charles Loper – brass (7)
 Bill Reichenbach Jr. – brass (7)
 Jerry Hey – brass (7), brass arrangements (7)
 Nashville String Machine – strings (1, 3-6, 8, 9, 10)
 David T. Clydesdale – orchestra arrangements and conductor (1, 3, 9, 10)
 Alan Moore – string arrangements and conductor (2, 4, 5, 6, 8)
 Carl Gorodetzky – string leader (1, 3-6, 8, 9, 10)
 Greg Nelson – rhythm arrangements (2, 4-8), string conductor (5)
 Dick Tunney – rhythm arrangements (4)
 2nd Chapter of Acts – guest vocals (2), vocal arrangements (2)

Backing vocals
 Alan Moore – vocal arrangements (5, 6, 8)
 Cozette Byrd (1)
 Beverly Darnall (1, 3, 9, 10)
 John Darnall (1)
 Steve Green (1)
 Marty McCall (1, 3, 5-10)
 John Mohr (1, 5)
 Ellen Musick (1)
 SandI Patti (1, 3, 5-10)
 Craig Patty (1, 3, 5-10)
 Mike Patty (1, 3, 9, 10)
 Jane Sherberg (1, 5)
 Leah Taylor (1, 3, 9, 10)
 Tammy Boyer (3, 9, 10) 
 Rick Gibson (3, 9, 10)
 Lynn Hodges (3, 9, 10)
 Bonnie Keen (3, 5-10)
 David Maddux (3, 5-10), vocal arrangements (7)
 W. Keith Moore  (3, 9, 10)
 Jon Sherberg (3, 5, 9)
 Steve Taylor (3, 9, 10)
 Tammy Taylor (3, 9, 10)
 Melodie Tunney (3, 5-9)
 Love In Any Language Choir – choir (5)
 Greg Nelson – vocal contractor (5)

Production 
 John Helvering – executive producer 
 Greg Nelson – producer 
 SandI Patti – producer 
 Bob Clark – engineer (1, 3, 9, 10), additional engineer 
 Ed Seay – mixing (1, 3, 9, 10), chief engineer (2, 4, 5, 7, 8), engineer (3, 6, 9, 10)
 John Bolt – additional engineer, mixing (6)
 Bill Heath – additional engineer 
 Steve Hodge – additional engineer 
 Kent Madison – additional engineer 
 Tom Harding – assistant engineer 
 David Murphy – assistant engineer 
 MasterMix (Nashville, Tennessee) – mastering location 
 Cindy Wilt – production assistant
 Dennis hill – art direction, design 
 Mike Borum – photography 
 Mark Johnson – photography

Charts

Year-end charts

Radio singles

Certifications and sales

Accolades
Grammy Awards

GMA Dove Awards
1987, 1988 Female Vocalist of the Year
1987 Artist of the Year

References

1986 albums
Sandi Patty albums
Word Records albums